John Albert Adams (November 28, 1937 – August 8, 1995) was a professional American football fullback in the National Football League. He played for five seasons for the Chicago Bears (1959–1962) and the Los Angeles Rams (1963).  Adams was a fifth round selection (57th overall pick) of the Bears in the 1959 NFL Draft out of California State University, Los Angeles.

References

External links
 

1937 births
1995 deaths
American football running backs
Cal State Los Angeles Diablos football players
Chicago Bears players
Los Angeles Rams players
Santa Monica Corsairs football players
Players of American football from San Diego